Juodšiliai is a village Vilnius District Municipality, it is located only about  south-east of Vilnius city municipality. It is the seat of Juodšiliai eldership and is further subdivided into 4 seniūnaitijos (subelderships). 

The village is home to Church of Blessed Mykolas Sopočka (built in 2016), post office, dispensary, two high schools and a library.

History 
Juodšiliai houses a tumulus. During World War I, a forest was cut down in the area of the current village and a railway was built. Until 1920, the railway station was called Reslerava. During Polish rule, Juodšiliai housed a monastery with an orphanage and primary school. During Soviet occupation, it was a local administrative center.

References 

Villages in Vilnius County